The 1952 South Australian National Football League season was the 73rd season of the top-level Australian rules football competition in South Australia.

Minor Round

Round 1

Ladder

Finals

Grand Final

References 

SANFL
South Australian National Football League seasons